"Mama Said" is a song performed by the Shirelles, written by Luther Dixon and Willie Denson. It became a top-ten hit, on both the pop and R&B charts, when it was released as a single in 1961. "Mama Said" went #4 on the Billboard Hot 100 and #2 on the R&B chart and has been covered by American Spring, Melanie, Dusty Springfield, The Stereos, The Growlers, and a young Dionne Bromfield.  It was also the inspiration for "Days Like This" by Van Morrison. Nick Lowe covered it on his 2001 album, The Convincer. "Mama Said" was featured during the closing of the third season Orange is the New Black episode, "Fake it Till You Fake it Some More" and also appeared in the seventh season of Adventure Time at the end of the eponymous episode, "Mama Said."

Billboard named the song #44 on their list of 100 Greatest Girl Group Songs of All Time.

Charts

Dionne Bromfield version
"Mama Said" was covered by Dionne Bromfield for her album Introducing. It made #43 on the UK Singles Chart.

References

1961 songs
1961 singles
1970 singles
Songs written by Luther Dixon
The Shirelles songs
Little Eva songs
Nick Lowe songs
Scepter Records singles
Songs about mothers